Spring of Youth may refer to:

 1973 Israeli raid on Lebanon or Operation Spring of Youth
 Spring of Youth, a march by Hermann Ludwig Blankenburg
 Spring of Youth (Taiwan), an old water source in Changhua County, Taiwan